Soheir Zaki (born in Mansoura, Egypt on January 4, 1945) is an Egyptian belly dancer and actress. She appeared in over 100 Egyptian films from the 1960s to the 1980s.

Early life
Soheir Zaki was born in Mansoura, Egypt on January 4, 1945. When she was nine, her parents moved the family to Alexandria. Her father died when she was young and her mother remarried. Her stepfather later became her manager. Zaki first learned how to dance by watching films featuring Taheyya Kariokka and Samia Gamal.

Career
She began her career as a wedding dancer in Alexandria. Television producer Mohammed Salem saw her dancing and decided to launch her as a TV presenter on Egyptian television. However, she showed more skill as a dancer and became known for her appearances on shows like Adwoua El-Madina. She then moved to appearing in Egyptian films. She played minor roles in most of her films, concentrating mainly on dancing. In interviews, she has stated that Nagua Fouad was her "biggest rival" at the time.

Zaki also performed frequently in Egyptian nightclubs, particularly at the Nile Hilton Hotel in Cairo. In 1964, she became to first belly dancer to dance to Umm Kulthum's music when she danced to "Inta Omri".

Over the course of her career, Zaki danced for many politicians, including Anwar Sadat, Gamal Abdel Nasser and Richard Nixon. She retired in 1992, although she later taught belly dance at Raqia Hassan's Egyptian Academy of Oriental Dance in Cairo.

Personal life
She was married to Egyptian cinematographer Mohamed Emara. She gave birth to their son Hamada in 1987.

Partial filmography
1963 Thaman al Hob (The Price of Love)
 1963 Aelit Zizi''' (Zizi's Family)
 1963 Sanawat El Hobb’ (Years of Love)
 1964 Hekayet Gawaz (The Story of a Marriage)
 1964 Daani wal demouh (Alone with My Tears)
 1964 Matloub Zawja Fawran (An Intimate Wedding)
 1966 Cairo 30 1966 Al Abeed (The Idiot)
 1969 Al-shaitan  (The devil)
 1969 Al-Rajul Zu Al-Khamsat Wujooh (The Man with Five Faces) – TV miniseries
 1970 Seraa Maa el Mawt (The Struggle with Death)
 1970 El Maganeen el Talata (The Three Lunatics)
 1971 Rejal fil al Misyada (Men in the Trap)
 1972 Melouk al Shar (Kings of Evil)
 1975 Alo, ana al ghetta (Hello, I am the Cat)
 1978 Sultana al Tarab 
 1978 ‘Al Kallema Al Akhira (The Last Word)
 1979 Yomhel wala Yohmel (God Waits but Never Neglects)
 1982 Aroussa Wa Gouz Ersan (A Bride and Two Grooms)
 1983 Enna Rabbaka Labelmersad (The Lord of the Lookout)
 1983 Al Rajel Elle Ba'aa al Shams''

References

External links
Soheir Zaki on the IMDb

1945 births
Egyptian female dancers
Belly dancers
Egyptian film actresses
People from Mansoura, Egypt
Living people